Jeolla Province was one of the historical Eight Provinces of Korea during the Kingdom of Joseon in today Southwestern Korea. It consisted of the modern South Korean provinces of North Jeolla, South Jeolla and Gwangju Metropolitan City as well as the Jeju Province. The provincial capital was Jeonju, the current capital of North Jeolla. The entire inland region was called Honam ("South of the Lake"), which is still commonly used today.

History

Samhan and Samguk

During the Samhan era of Korean history, the area of Jeolla was controlled by the Mahan confederacy and the Tamna kingdom on Jeju. Fifteen of the 45 Korean tribes had their bases in this region. When Baekje overtook Mahan by the 5th century, the Three Kingdoms era began and the region became part of southern Baekje. Jungbang was the center of the province during this period.

Unified Silla
When Silla conquered Baekje with the help of Tang China in 660, it became a territory of Later Silla during the 16th year of the reign of Munmu of Silla. Silla reorganized this territory into 9 "ju" and 5 "gyeong", 3 of the ju belonging to the former Baekje. The northern territory of former Baekje, Ung (Ungju), corresponds to modern-day South Chungcheong Province.

The middle area consisted of Wansan and Namwon, which correspond to modern-day North Jeolla. Wansan was later renamed Jeonju. The southern area consisted of Mujin (Mujin-ju), which was renamed Mu in 757, the 16th year of the reign of Gyeongdeok of Silla. Mu consisted of one gun and 43 hyeon, and corresponds to modern-day South Jeolla.

Goryeo Dynasty
In 983, during the second year of the reign of Seongjong of Goryeo, the country was reorganized into 12 "mok". Jeonju became Jeonju-mok, while Muju was split into the two mok of Naju and Seungju. In 995, King Seongjong again reorganized the country, this time into 10 "do" (도; 道; "province"). Jeonju-mok was renamed Gangnam-do ("province south of the river") while Naju and Seungju were reunited and renamed Haeyang-do ("ocean province").

In 1018, during the 9th year of the reign of Hyeonjong of Goryeo, the country was again reorganized in 5 do, and the provinces of Gangnam and Haeyang were merged to form the province of Jeollaju. The name derived from the names of the principal cities of Jeonju and Naju. (The difference between Na-  and -la is due to the ("initial sound rule" of modern Korean). This was the first time the area currently known as Jeolla was united under one administrative division, and it would remain this way for nearly eight centuries.

Joseon: 1392-1910
In 1413, during 13th year of the right of Taejong of Joseon, the territories were, once again, reorganized into 8 do. This is the era of the historic Eight Provinces. Jeollajudo was variously known as Gwangnam, Jeongwang, and Jeonnam, but the original name persisted, and was eventually shortened to simply Jeollado. 

The Donghak Peasant Revolution of 1894-95 began in Jeollado, which was a peasant revolt fueled by the fervor of a coming local "messiah" and protests over Seoul's high taxes on rice and increasing number of Japanese traders in Joseon. They had anti-Japanese sentiments due to the Japanese invasions of Korea (1592–1598).

On May 26, 1895, Gojong of Korea replaced the 8 do system with a 23 bu "district" system and Jeolla was replaced by the districts of Jeonju in the northwest, Naju in the southwest, Namwon in the east, and Jeju on Jejudo.

On August 4, 1896, Emperor Gojong issued Royal Order 36, repealing the district system and restoring the province system. Jeolla, along with Chungcheong Province, Gyeongsang Province, Hamgyong Province and Pyongan Province, were divided north-south into North Jeolla Province and South Jeolla Province, bringing the total to 13 provinces.

Republic of Korea: 1948-present
North Jeolla Province consisted of the Jeonju and northern Namwon districts, while South Jeolla Province consisted of the southern Namwon districts, Naju district, and Jeju island. Jeonju was retained as the capital of North Jeolla, with Gwangju being made the capital of South Jeolla. The capital of South Jeolla was later moved to Namak, South Korea in 2005, with Gwangju designated a Special City.

Jeolla is a stronghold of the liberal Democratic Party of Korea.

Geography
Jeolla Province was bounded on the north by Chungcheong Province, on the east by Gyeongsang Province, on the south by the East China Sea, and on the west by the Yellow Sea. The region is bordered on the east by the Sobaek Mountains and is drained by the Yeongsan, Seomjin and Mangyeong River. The largest city in the region is Gwangju. Apart from Jeonju and Naju, other cities of note include Iksan (formerly Iri), Gunsan, Mokpo, Namwon, Suncheon, and Yeosu.

References

External links
 Seoul City history article on Hanseong and 22 other late 19th-century districts (in Korean)

Provinces of Korea
Joseon dynasty